Erythroferrone is a protein hormone encoded in humans by the ERFE gene.  Erythroferrone is produced by erythroblasts, inhibits the production of hepcidin in the liver, and so increases the amount of iron available for hemoglobin synthesis. Skeletal muscle secreted ERFE has been shown to maintain systemic metabolic homeostasis.

Discovery 
It was identified in 2014 in mice where the transcript was found in bone marrow, encoded by the mouse Fam132b gene.  The homologous gene in humans is FAM132B and the sequence is conserved in other species. The protein is synthesized by erythroblasts and secreted.  This sequence had previously been found expressed in mouse skeletal muscle, called myonectin (CTRP15), and linked to lipid homeostasis.

Seldin and his colleagues have written: "Myonectin is expressed and secreted predominantly by skeletal muscle.... (Our) results suggest that myonectin is a nutrient-responsive metabolic regulator secreted by skeletal muscle in response to changes in cellular energy state resulting from glucose or fatty acid fluxes. Many metabolically relevant secreted proteins (e.g. adiponectin, leptin, resistin, and RBP) and the signaling pathways they regulate in tissues are known to be dysregulated in the condition of obesity. The reduction in expression and circulating levels of myonectin in the obese state may represent yet another component of the complex metabolic circuitry dysregulated by excess caloric intake. Although exercise has long been known to have profound positive impacts on systemic insulin sensitivity and energy balance, the underlying mechanisms remain incompletely understood. That voluntary exercise dramatically increases the expression and circulating levels of myonectin to promote fatty acid uptake into cells may underlie one of the beneficial effects of physical exercise."

Myonectin was shown in 2015 to be identical to erythroferrone, a hormone produced in erythroblasts that is involved in iron metabolism.>

Structure 
Erythroferrone in humans is transcribed as a precursor of 354 amino acids, with a signal peptide of 28 amino acids.  The mouse gene encodes a 340 amino acid protein which is 71% identical.  Homology is greater at the C-terminal where there is a TNF-alpha-like domain. As a member of the C1q/TNF-Related Protein (CTRP) family, erythroferrone has a 4-domain structure with a unique N-terminus. The two larger domains are connected by a short, proline-rich, collagenous linker that is thought to promote protein multimerization. Erythroferrone is predicted to contain two PCSK3/furin recognition sites. The protein hormone weighs approximately 35-40 kDa.

Function 
Erythroferrone is a hormone that regulates iron metabolism through its actions on hepcidin.  As shown in mice and humans, it is produced in erythroblasts, which proliferate when new red cells are synthesized, such as after hemorrhage when more iron is needed (so-called stress erythropoiesis).  This process is governed by the renal hormone, erythropoietin.

Its mechanism of action is to inhibit the expression of the liver hormone, hepcidin.  This process is governed by the renal hormone, erythropoietin.  By suppressing hepcidin, ERFE increases the function of the cellular iron export channel, ferroportin.  This then results in increased iron absorption from the intestine and mobilization of iron from stores, which can then be used in the synthesis of hemoglobin in new red blood cells. Erythroferrone inhibits hepcidin synthesis by binding bone morphogenetic proteins and thereby inhibiting the bone morphogenetic protein pathway that controls hepcidin expression.

Mice deficient in the gene encoding erythroferrone have transient maturational hemoglobin deficits and impaired hepcidin suppression in response to phlebotomy with a delayed recovery from anemia.

In its role as myonectin, it also promotes lipid uptake into adipocytes and hepatocytes.

Regulation 
Synthesis of erythroferrone is stimulated by erythropoietin binding to its receptor and activating the Jak2/Stat5 signaling pathway.

Clinical significance 
The clinical significance in humans is becoming clear.  From parallels in the mouse studies, there may be diseases where its function could be relevant.  In a mouse model of thalassemia, its expression is increased, resulting in iron overload, which is also a feature of the human disease.  A role in the recovery from the anemia of inflammation in mice has been shown and involvement in inherited anemias with ineffective erythropoiesis, anemia of chronic kidney diseases and iron-refractory iron-deficiency anemia has been suggested.

Erythroferrone levels in blood have been shown by immunoassay to be higher after blood loss or erythropoetin administration. Patients with beta-thalassemia have very high levels, and these decrease after blood transfusion.

References 

Human hormones
Peptide hormones
Iron metabolism
Blood proteins
Hematology
Hepatology